Nicrophorus orientalis may refer to:

 Nicrophorus americanus, misidentified in 1784 by Johann Friedrich Wilhelm Herbst
 Nicrophorus dauricus, misidentified in 1860 by Motschulsky